Ausnara Union is a union of Madhupur Upazila, Tangail District, Bangladesh. It is situated  21 km southeast of Madhupur and 59 km northeast of Tangail in the middle of the Madhupur tract.

Demographics

According to Population Census 2011 performed by Bangladesh Bureau of Statistics, The total population of Ausnara union is 56794. There are  14624 households in total.

Education

The literacy rate of Ausnara Union is 37.7% (Male-39.5%, Female-36%).

See also
 Union Councils of Tangail District

References

Populated places in Dhaka Division
Populated places in Tangail District
Unions of Madhupur Upazila